The Balkans Since 1453  is a book by the Greek-Canadian historian L.S. Stavrianos published in 1958. It is a large, synthetic work which encompasses the major political, economic and cultural events of the Balkans from the fall of the Byzantine Empire to the late 1940s.

Stavrianos paid particular attention to the national awakening and the nation-building process in the Balkans. The book was highly acclaimed by many historians of the Balkans, including Traian Stoianovich and Mark Mazower.

External links 
 Jason C. Mavrovitis on the book

1958 non-fiction books
History books about the Balkans
20th-century history books
English-language books